Omid Abtahi (born 12 July 1979) is an Iranian-American actor. He is best known for his roles as Salim in Starz Original American Gods, Penn Pershing in The Mandalorian on Disney+, Saleem Ulman in NCIS on Paramount+, and Homes in the fourth installment of The Hunger Games film series, The Hunger Games: Mockingjay – Part 2.

Early life and education
Abtahi was born in Tehran, Iran. At the age of 5 he moved to Paris with his family and later they moved to the United States, finally moving to Irvine, Orange County, California when he was 10.

Abtahi graduated from University High School in Irvine and attended California State University, Fullerton. He began studying advertising, then picked up a second major in theater and graduated in 2002.

Career
Before acting on television, Abtahi performed on stage in many theatrical productions including Fraulein Else at the Berkeley Repertory, McCarter Theatre and Longwarf Theatre; Adoration of the Old Woman at the Sundance Theatre Lab and Your Everyday Typical Romantic Comedy at the Kennedy Centre. He has also guest starred on the television series JAG, Judging Amy and 24. He played Justin Yates in Ghost Whisperer.

After arriving in Los Angeles, Abtahi was a series regular on FX's Over There and Showtime's Sleeper Cell.

Abtahi made his New York stage debut in Urge for Going by Mona Mansour. He is also the voice of Farid in Call of Duty: Black Ops II, and of Sergeant John Lugo in Spec Ops: The Line. He also voices Victor "Gator" Diallo in Call of Duty: Infinite Warfare.

Filmography

Film

Television

Video game

Short film

References

External links

TITANS OF HOLLYWOOD: Tinsel Town's Spotlights Shine on CSUF Alumni by Cathi Douglas '80, California State University, Fullerton TITAN Magazine (calstate.fullerton.edu), 2011
'Mockingjay' casts Omid Abtahi as Homes by Andrew Sims (hypable.com), September 24, 2013
Alumnus Omid Abtahi cast in Hunger Games by Ethan Hawke (ocregister.com), Sept. 17, 2014 (Updated: Sept. 30, 2014)
Interviews with Young Iranians: Omid Abtahi, Actor by ParsArts.com - 24 Jan 2007

1979 births
American male stage actors
American male television actors
Iranian emigrants to the United States
Living people
California State University, Fullerton alumni
21st-century American male actors
Male actors from Tehran
American male film actors
Male actors from Orange County, California
Iranian diaspora film people
American male video game actors